Laurence Joseph Sheffield (27 April 1939 – 9 November 2021) was a Welsh footballer who played as a centre forward in the Football League.

Following his second period with Doncaster Rovers, Sheffield was signed by Peterborough United for £10,000.

Sheffield died on 9 November 2021, at the age of 82.

References

External links

Doncaster Free Press, Expert Corner, Laurie Sheffield

1939 births
2021 deaths
Welsh footballers
Footballers from Swansea
Association football forwards
Barry Town United F.C. players
Newport County A.F.C. players
Doncaster Rovers F.C. players
Norwich City F.C. players
Rotherham United F.C. players
Oldham Athletic A.F.C. players
Luton Town F.C. players
Peterborough United F.C. players
English Football League players